Black Crow automobiles were manufactured from 1909 until 1911 by the Crow Motor Car Company in Elkhart, Indiana, and sold by the Black Motor Company.

References

Sources
Wise, David Burgess. The New Illustrated Encyclopedia of Automobiles. 

Defunct motor vehicle manufacturers of the United States
Motor vehicle manufacturers based in Indiana
1910s cars
Companies based in Elkhart County, Indiana
Defunct manufacturing companies based in Indiana